Quatarrius Deaundrey Wilson (born June 26, 1996) is an American basketball player who plays for Köping Stars in the Swedish Basketball League.

College career
Wilson played collegiate with Moberly, McNeese State and Southeast Missouri State.

Professional career
On June 26, 2021, Wilson signed in the Netherlands with BAL of the Dutch Basketball League (DBL). He helped the team qualify for the playoffs for the first time while leading the league in rebounding. On 2 May 2021, BAL surprisingly won the DBL Cup with BAL after defeating Yoast United in the final. Wilson recorded 14 points, 15 rebounds and 5 assists in the won championship game.

In the following season, the 2021–22 season, Wilson played for Panthers Schwenningen of the German ProA.

On June 16, 2022, Wilson signed with the Swedish club Köping Stars of the Swedish Basketball League for the upcoming season.

References

External links
RealGM profile

1996 births
Living people
American men's basketball players
Basketball Academie Limburg players
Panthers Schwenningen players
Power forwards (basketball)
Dutch Basketball League players
Southeast Missouri State Redhawks men's basketball players
McNeese Cowboys basketball players